Pamela 'Pam' Matthews (born 8 February 1958) is an Australian athlete. She competed in the women's javelin throw at the 1980 Summer Olympics.

References

1958 births
Living people
Athletes (track and field) at the 1980 Summer Olympics
Australian female javelin throwers
Olympic athletes of Australia
Place of birth missing (living people)